Erkek Ve Dişi is a 1966 Turkish drama film, directed by Halit Refiğ and starring Fikret Hakan, Selda Alkor, and Reha Yurdakul.

References

External links
Erkek Ve Dişi at the Internet Movie Database

1966 films
Turkish drama films
1966 drama films
Films directed by Halit Refiğ